Bushbury North is a ward of Wolverhampton City Council, West Midlands, England.  It is situated to the north of the city centre, on the city's border with South Staffordshire.

As well as South Staffordshire, Bushbury North borders the Fallings Park, Bushbury South and Low Hill and Oxley wards, and forms part of the Wolverhampton North East constituency.  It contains the northern part of Bushbury as well as Fordhouses.

The National Trust property of Moseley Old Hall is nearby, over the border in Staffordshire, but can only be reached from Bushbury North.

Northicote Secondary school is situated in the ward: it was briefly in the national spotlight in 1998 when its headteacher became the first of a Comprehensive school to receive a knighthood.

Wards of Wolverhampton City Council